Vibrissea is a genus of fungi in the family Vibrisseaceae. According to the Dictionary of the Fungi (10th edition, 2008), the widespread genus encompasses about 30 semiaquatic to aquatic species.

Species
Vibrissea albofusca
Vibrissea catarhyta
Vibrissea decolorans
Vibrissea dura
Vibrissea fergussonii
Vibrissea filisporia
Vibrissea flavovirens
Vibrissea guernisacii
Vibrissea leptospora
Vibrissea margarita
Vibrissea microscopica
Vibrissea norvegica
Vibrissea nypicola
Vibrissea pfisteri
Vibrissea sporogyra
Vibrissea truncorum
Vibrissea turbinata
Vibrissea vibrisseoides

References

External links

Helotiales
Taxa named by Elias Magnus Fries
Taxa described in 1822